Origins is the sixth studio album by Irish post-rock band God Is an Astronaut. It was released on September 16, 2013 in the UK, and in the US a day later.

Reception

Origins received positive reviews from critics. On Metacritic, the album holds a score of 78/100 based on 4 reviews, indicating "generally favorable reviews."

Track listing

References

2013 albums
God Is an Astronaut albums